WBBO (98.5 FM, "B98-5") is a radio station broadcasting a Contemporary Hit Radio format. Licensed to Ocean Acres, New Jersey, it serves Ocean & Burlington counties in New Jersey. It first Sign-on On March 10, 1993. 1993 under the call sign WQNJ, but more recently operated under WKMK. The station is currently owned by Press Communications.

Coverage Area
98.5's signal blankets Ocean and Burlington in New Jersey as well as the New Jersey suburbs of Philadelphia. The station can be heard from Atlantic City to the South, Belmar to the North, and Philadelphia to the West.

The WBBO antenna is co-located with WVBH and W265CS on a tower located near the intersection of Route 72 and the Garden State Parkway in Manahawkin.

Early history
98.5 was granted the WQNJ calls on February 7, 1990. Even before this station hit the air, it had extensive coverage in the local newspapers, because it was to be the first commercial station to hit the air in Ocean County since WJRZ signed on in 1976. FM 98.5 was originally owned by Seaira, Inc., a local company that was headed by Pat Parson, a former WCBS/880 news anchor from 1970 to 1990 and a former alumnus of WERA in Planfield.

Parson originally planned 98.5 to be a live and local Smooth Jazz station, using the slogan "Cloud Nine," with an original sign-on date of Spring 1991. However, that sign-on date changed many times, due mostly because of antenna clearances that had to be taken care of prior to signing on. In late 1992, with Seaira not having enough financial backing to sign on themselves with a local format, 98.5 entered into an agreement with D&K Broadcasting (the owners of WJLK at the time.)

On February 11, 1993, WQNJ began on-air testing and on March 10, 1993, officially signed on with a simulcast of 94.3  WJLK. It was pretty much a 100% simulcast, with the exception of local commercial cut-ins and on weekday mornings at 6, 7, 8 and 9 o’clock, Pat Parson would do a 5-minute newscast.
This basic format lasted until 1996 when it was announced that Nassau Broadcasting had purchased the station (and others in the Jersey Shore area.)

B98.5

Pat Parson's newscasts were soon discontinued.  The simulcast continued with WJLK until Memorial Day weekend in 1997 when Nassau launched "B-98.5 – The Jersey Shore's Hit Music Station."
The first song played on "B-98.5" was the Spice Girls "Wannabe".
On July 11, 1997, the calls were changed to WBBO.

In 2001, Nassau sold WBBO (along with WOBM-FM and WJLK) to Millennium Radio Group. in march of 2002 WCHR 105.7 simulcast was on the air but on April 15, 2002 105.7 WCHR ends it Simulcast and WCHR changes it format to Classic Rock.  In April 2003, it was announced that Millennium was selling WBBO to Press Communications, who ironically enough, was the original applicant for 98.5 in the late 1980s. In August 2004, Press officially took over WBBO.

Alumni
Original Staff * Neil Sullivan, Program Director 1997–1999 * Fox Feltman (aka. Alan Fox), Assistant Program Director/Music Director, Afternoons 1997–1999 * Jessica Taylor, Midday host, 1999 * Andy Chase, Promotions and Swing jock 1997–2003, morning host 2003–2004 * Mike and Diane, Mornings 1998–1999 * JC, then Scotty Valentino Nights 1997–1999 * Ed Bishop, Imaging Director * General Manager Don Dalesio 1997–2002; 2016–2019

G Rock Radio
On February 18, 2005, 98.5 started simulcasting sister station WHTG-FM "G-106.3" from Eatontown and became GRock Radio. On July 5, 2006, 98.5 changed calls to WKOE as part of a switch with new move-in 106.5 in Bass River Township. WKOE was formerly located at 106.3 in Ocean City On July 24, 2006 at midnight, the simulcast on 98.5 ceased.

Real Jersey Kountry K98.5

Later on July 24, 2006, after "stunting" with playing The Eagles "New Kid In Town" over and over for 12 hours, 98.5 debuted as "K-98.5: Real Jersey Kountry" and new call letters of WKOE, were assigned at 10 a.m. that day (switching from WBBO which had been re-instated). The WKOE call letters were quickly replaced with WKMK to avoid a legal situation after it was noted that using WKOE on a country formatted station violated a usage agreement that Press Broadcasting signed regarding the WKOE calls.
The first song played was Alan Jackson's "Gone Country." Past staffers of K98.5 include Jim Radler, Leeann Taylor and Brian Moore.

Ocean County's Country Thunder 98.5

On February 16, 2009, "K98.5" under the direction of longtime Country Music PD Captain Jack Aponte, switched its name to "Thunder 98.5". Along with the name change, Captain Jack changed the station's format to an edgier "Rockin Country" sound, playing some classic southern rock along with country music; similar southern rock/country "hybrid" formats were used unsuccessfully on various U.S. country outlets in the 1990s, most even used the same "Thunder Country" moniker also.

B 98.5 returns
The station swapped its "Thunder" country format with co-owned WHTG and WBBO on September 15, 2010 at 3:00 p.m. At that time, the station resumed its former identity of "B 98.5", and at that time also swapped call signals, assuming the WHTG-FM identity long associated with 106.3 FM in Eatontown, which became WKMK at that time. some of the staff were a carry-over from Hit 106. In the weeks leading up to the station change, commercials continuously announced "Hit 106 is moving down the dial". On December 8, 2010, 98.5 Went back to The WBBO Calls.

Airstaff
The current lineup (as of January 3, 2022) is as follows

B98.5 Morning Show (6–10 am): TJ Mateo & Lenore (Lenny) Luca

Middays (10 am – 2pm): Danny Rios

Afternoon (2–6 pm): Rashaud Thomas

Nights (6 pm-midnight): E

Program Director/Music Director: Rashaud Thomas

References

External links

Contemporary hit radio stations in the United States
BBO
Radio stations established in 1993
1993 establishments in New Jersey